Jean Carllo Maciel (born 28 February 1989) is a Brazilian professional footballer who currently plays as a midfielder for Hong Kong Premier League club HKFC.

Career statistics

Club

Notes

References

External links
 Yau Yee Football League profile

Living people
1989 births
People from Anápolis
Brazilian footballers
Portuguese footballers
Association football midfielders
Hong Kong First Division League players
Boavista F.C. players
S.C. Salgueiros players
F.C. Pedras Rubras players
Santa Maria F.C. players
Artsul Futebol Clube players
Hong Kong FC players
Brazilian expatriate footballers
Portuguese expatriate footballers
Brazilian expatriate sportspeople in Hong Kong
Portuguese expatriate sportspeople in Hong Kong
Expatriate footballers in Hong Kong
Sportspeople from Goiás